Petr Průcha (born September 14, 1982) is a Czech former professional ice hockey forward who played in the National Hockey League (NHL) for the New York Rangers and the Phoenix Coyotes.

Playing career
Průcha led the Czech Republic Junior League in points during the 2001–02 season (33 assists and 56 points in 25 games). He  was drafted by the New York Rangers in the eighth round of the 2002 NHL Entry Draft, 240th overall. He played 47 games in the 2004–05 season for HC Moeller Pardubice in the Czech Extraliga, scoring seven goals with 17 points.

In the 2005–06 season, he joined the Rangers as a rookie, and under the tutelage of Jaromír Jágr,  he scored 30 goals and 47 points in 68 games. His 16 powerplay goals on the season broke Camille Henry's record for the single-season rookie power play goal mark for the Rangers.

On July 5, 2007, Průcha re-signed with the Rangers to a two-year, $3.2 million contract.

On March 4, 2009, Průcha was traded to the Phoenix Coyotes, along with Dimitri Kalinin and Nigel Dawes, in exchange for defenceman Derek Morris. On June 19, 2009, he signed a two-year, $2.2 million contract extension with the Coyotes, worth $1.1 million annually.

After playing unproductively for some time, the Coyotes assigned Průcha to the San Antonio Rampage of the American Hockey League (AHL), their top minor league affiliate. Unwilling to play for a minor league team, Průcha soon left for the Kontinental Hockey League (KHL) to play for SKA Saint Petersburg.

After two seasons with Saint Petersburg, Průcha sat out the following season before opting to retire due to injury.

Career statistics

Regular season and playoffs

International

References

External links
 
 

1982 births
Living people
Czech ice hockey right wingers
Hartford Wolf Pack players
HC Dynamo Pardubice players
New York Rangers draft picks
New York Rangers players
People from Chrudim
Phoenix Coyotes players
San Antonio Rampage players
SKA Saint Petersburg players
Sportspeople from the Pardubice Region
Czech expatriate ice hockey players in the United States
Czech expatriate ice hockey players in Russia